Bambusa concava is a species of Bambusa bamboo.

Distribution 
Bambusa concava is endemic to Hainan province of China.

References 

Flora of Hainan
concava